Dirk Rupnow (born 1972 in Berlin, Germany) is a German historian. Since 2009 he has taught as Assistant Professor, since 2013 as Associate Professor at the University of Innsbruck, Austria, since 2010 he has been Head of the Institute for Contemporary History there.

Life 

Rupnow studied history, German literature, philosophy and art history at the Free University Berlin and the University of Vienna. He completed his studies in Vienna 1999. 2002 he received his PhD from the University of Klagenfurt, Austria. In 2009 he completed his Habilitation at the University of Vienna. 1999/2000 he worked as a research associate for the Historians‘ Commission of the Republic of Austria. 2000/01 he was a Junior Fellow at the Internationalen Research Center for Cultural Studies IFK, Vienna, 2004-07 a Postdoc fellow in the framework of the Austrian Programme for Advanced Research and Technology APART of the Austrian Academy of Sciences ÖAW, 2007-09 a visiting fellow at Institute for Human Sciences IWM, Vienna. Since 2007 he has been a lecturer, since 2009 Senior Lecturer at the Department of Contemporary History at the University of Vienna. 2008 he was elected member of the „Junge Kurie“ of the Austrian Academy of Sciences ÖAW.

Rupnow taught as a Visiting Assistant Professor in the Jewish Studies Program at Dartmouth College, at the University of Bielefeld and was invited for fellowships at the History Department of Duke University, the Simon Dubnow Institute for Jewish History and Culture at Leipzig University  and the  Center for Advanced Holocaust Studies at the United States Holocaust Memorial Museum in Washington, DC.

Awards 

For his work Rupnow received numerous international awards, e.g. 2009 the Fraenkel Prize in Contemporary History of the Wiener Library, London, and 2011 the „Humanities International“ award of the German Publishers and Booksellers Association.

Professional memberships 

Junge Kurie, Austrian Academy of Sciences ÖAW (elected 2008), American Historical Association AHA (since 2003), German Studies Association GSA (since 2003), Austrian Scientists and Scholars in North America ASCINA (since 2004), 
Society for History of Science GWG (elected 2007). Since 2017, he is also member of the International Academic Advisory Board of the Vienna Wiesenthal Institute for Holocaust Studies VWI.

Selected publications 

 Judenforschung im Dritten Reich: Wissenschaft zwischen Politik, Propaganda und Ideologie (Historische Grundlagen der Moderne, Autoritäre Regime und Diktaturen 4). Nomos, Baden-Baden 2011, .
 Zeitgeschichte ausstellen in Österreich. Museen – Gedenkstätten – Ausstellungen, Böhlau, Wien u.a. 2011,  (hrsg. mit H. Uhl).
 Pseudowissenschaft. Konzeptionen von Nichtwissenschaftlichkeit in der Wissenschaftsgeschichte (Suhrkamp Taschenbüch Wissenschaft 1897). Suhrkamp, Frankfurt a.M. 2008,  (hrsg. mit V. Lipphardt/J. Thiel/Ch. Wessely).
 Aporien des Gedenkens. Reflexionen über ‚Holocaust’ und Erinnerung (Edition Parabasen Bd. 5). Rombach Wissenschaften, Freiburg/Br.–Berlin 2006, .
 Vernichten und Erinnern. Spuren nationalsozialistischer Gedächtnispolitik. Wallstein-Verlag, Göttingen 2005, .
 Die „Zentralstelle für jüdische Auswanderung“ als Beraubungsinstitution. Veröffentlichungen der Österreichischen Historikerkommission. Vermögensentzug während der NS-Zeit sowie Rückstellungen und Entschädigungen seit 1945 in Österreich (Nationalsozialistische Institutionen des Vermögensentzuges Bd. 20. 1. T.). Oldenbourg, München u.a. 2004,  (mit G. Anderl).
 Täter-Gedächtnis-Opfer. Das „Jüdische Zentralmuseum“ in Prag 1942-1945. Picus Verlag, Wien 2000, .

References

External links 

 
 Dirk Rupnow at the Homepage of the Instituts of Contemporary History at the University of Innsbruck 
 Dirk Rupnow Fellow at the United States Holocaust Memorial Museum

Historians of the Holocaust
Contemporary historians
1972 births
Living people